Orlando Polanco (born 1 January 1999) is a Cuban judoka.

He is the bronze medallist of the 2019 Judo Grand Slam Abu Dhabi in the -66 kg category.

References

External links
 

1999 births
Living people
Cuban male judoka
20th-century Cuban people
21st-century Cuban people